The Miridae are a large and diverse insect family at one time known by the taxonomic synonym Capsidae. Species in the family may be referred to as capsid bugs or "mirid bugs". Common names include plant bugs, leaf bugs, and grass bugs. It is the largest family of true bugs belonging to the suborder Heteroptera; it includes over 10,000 known species, and new ones are being described constantly. Most widely known mirids are species that are notorious agricultural pests that pierce plant tissues, feed on the sap, and sometimes transmit viral plant diseases. Some species however, are predatory.

Description

Many of them have a hunched look, because of the shape of the prothorax, which carries the head bent down. Some are brightly coloured and attractively patterned, others drab or dark, most being inconspicuous. Some genera are ant mimics at certain stages of life. The Miridae do not have any ocelli. Their rostrum has four segments. One useful feature in identifying members of the family is the presence of a cuneus; it is the triangular tip of the corium, the firm, horny part of the forewing, the hemelytron. The cuneus is visible in nearly all Miridae, and only in a few other Hemiptera, notably the family Anthocoridae, which are not much like the Miridae in other ways. The tarsi almost always have three segments.

Some mirid species
 Lygus bugs (Lygus spp.), including the tarnished and western tarnished plant bugs, are serious pests in the cotton, strawberry, and alfalfa industries.
 Stenotus binotatus, a minor pest of cereal crops, especially wheat
 Apple dimpling bug (Campylomma liebknechti) damages apple blossoms and small growing fruits.
 Mosquito bugs Helopeltis and Afropeltis spp. – that infest various crops including tea, cacao and cotton
 Honeylocust plant bug (Diaphnocoris chlorionis) damages foliage on honeylocust trees.

 Green mirid (Creontiades dilutus) damages many types of field crops.
 Potato capsid (Closterotomus norwegicus) is a noted pest of potato and clover plants in New Zealand.
 Deraeocoris nebulosus prefers other insects to plants in its diet, and has been used as a biocontrol agent against mites and scale insects.
 Dicyphus hesperus sucks sap from various plants and preys on whitefly and red spider mites and can be used in biological pest control.

Systematics
This family includes a large number of species, many of which are still unknown, distributed in more than 1300 genera. The taxonomic tree includes the following subfamilies and numerous tribes:
 Bryocorinae
 Bryocorini
 Dicyphini
 Eccritotarsini
 Cylapinae
 Cylapini
 Fulviini
 Deraeocorinae
 Clivinematini
 Deraeocorini
 Hyaliodini
 Saturniomirini
 Surinamellini
 Termatophylini
 Isometopinae
 Diphlebini
 Isometopini
 Mirinae
 Herdoniini
 Hyalopeplini
 Mirini
 Pithanini
 Restheniini
 Stenodemini

 Orthotylinae
 Ceratocapsini
 Halticini
 Orthotylini
 Phylinae
 Hallodapini
 Leucophoropterini
 Phylini
 Pilophorini

Psallopinae
Auth.: Schuh, 1976
 Isometopsallops Herczek & Popov, 1992
 Psallops Usinger, 1946
 †Cylapopsallops Popov & Herczek, 2006
 †Epigonopsallops Herczek & Popov, 2009

Genera Incertae sedis
BioLib includes:

 Amulacoris Carvalho & China, 1959
 Anniessa Kirkaldy, 1903
 Auchus Distant, 1893
 Bahiarmiris Carvalho, 1977
 Brasiliocarnus Kerzhner & Schuh, 1995
 Carmelinus Carvalho & Gomes, 1972
 Carmelus Drake & Harris, 1932
 Chaetophylidea Knight, 1968
 Charitides Kerzhner, 1962
 Colimacoris Schaffner & Carvalho, 1985
 Cylapocerus Carvalho & Fontes, 1968
 Duckecylapus Carvalho, 1982
 Englemania Carvalho, 1985
 Eurycipitia Reuter, 1905
 Faliscomiris Kerzhner & Schuh, 1998
 Fuscus Distant, 1884
 Guerrerocoris Carvalho & China, 1959
 Gunhadya - monotypic Gunhadya rubrofasciata Distant, 1920
 Heterocoris Guérin-Ménéville in Sagra, 1857
 Knightocoris Carvalho & China, 1951
 Leonomiris Kerzhner & Schuh, 1998
 Macrotyloides Van Duzee, 1916
 Merinocapsus Knight, 1968
 Mircarvalhoia Kerzhner & Schuh, 1998
 Montagneria Akingbohungbe, 1978
 Muirmiris Carvalho, 1983
 Myochroocoris Reuter, 1909
 Nesosylphas Kirkaldy, 1908
 Notolobus Reuter, 1908
 Nymannus Distant, 1904
 Paracoriscus Kerzhner & Schuh, 1998
 Paraguayna Carvalho, 1986
 Prodomopsis TBD
 Prodomus TBD
 Pseudobryocoris Distant, 1884
 Pygophorisca Carvalho & Wallerstein, 1978
 Rayeria TBD
 Rewafulvia Carvalho, 1972
 Rhynacloa Reuter
 Rondonisca Carvalho & Costa, 1994
 Rondonoides Carvalho & Costa, 1994
 Rondonotylus Carvalho & Costa, 1994
 Spanogonicus Berg
 Sthenaridia TBD
 Zoilus Distant, 1884

References

Further reading
 
  Google books preview

External links

 PBI Plant Bug Index
 Link to Al Wheeler's book on the biology of mirids
 Research on mirids of Southern California at UC Riverside
 Garden fleahopper on the University of Florida / Institute of Food and Agricultural Sciences Featured Creatures website

 
Heteroptera families
Articles containing video clips
Taxa named by Carl Wilhelm Hahn